The British Aerospace P.1233-1 Saba (Small Agile Battlefield Aircraft) was a project of a British anti-helicopter and close air support attack aircraft, designed by British Aerospace.

Specifications

See also
 PZL-230 Skorpion
 Scaled Composites ARES

References

External links
 
 
 
 

P.1233
Propfan-powered aircraft